Reid Carolin is an American film producer, director, and screenwriter.

Biography
He wrote and produced the 2012 film Magic Mike, directed by Steven Soderbergh, and won a 2012 Peabody Award for writing and producing the documentary Earth Made of Glass, which premiered on HBO in April 2011. He was an associate producer and developed the story for the 2008 Paramount Pictures film Stop-Loss and was the cinematographer for the soldier-video sequences in the film. He is also a producer of the films Ten Years, White House Down, and 22 Jump Street. As of the mid-2010s he was scheduled to produce Gambit with producer-star Channing Tatum, and a reboot of Ghostbusters with male leads; both projects did not make it out of development.

He graduated from Harvard College. He was also the co-founder of Constellation.tv, a service presenting live interactive events built around streaming movies.

Philanthropy
Carolin worked briefly with Red Feather Development Group, a non-profit organization that builds straw-bale homes on Native American reservations, for whom he was involved with the short film Building One House.

Filmography

Executive producer
 White House Down (2013)
 22 Jump Street (2014)
 War Dog: A Soldier's Best Friend (2017) (Documentary)
 Fatherhood (2021)

References

External links

Year of birth missing (living people)
Living people
American film directors
American film producers
Harvard College alumni
American documentary film producers
American male screenwriters